This list of invertebrates of California lists invertebrate species (animals without a backbone) that are found in the US State of California. This list includes animals from the land, from freshwater, and from the ocean. The sequence of phyla is alphabetical.

Acanthocephala

Acoelomorpha

AnnelidaJames, S W (1994)
Many of these species were described by Hulton Wood and Samuel James.

Class Polychaeta

Arthropoda
Subphylum Crustacea

Class Branchiopoda

Order Anostraca

Family Branchinectidae, fairy shrimp

Order Notostraca  tadpole shrimp

Order Anomopoda  water fleas

Class Hexanauplia

Class Malacostraca

Order Decapoda, decapods

Order Isopoda, isopods

Suborder Oniscidea

Class Insecta 
California has over 30,000 insects in the entire state.

Order Coleoptera

Family Carabidae, ground beetles

Family Cerambycidae, longhorn beetles

Family Scarabaeidae, scarabs

Order Collembola

Order Dermaptera, earwigs

Order Dictyoptera

Order Diptera

Order Embiidina

Order Ephemeroptera

Order Grylloblattidae

Order Hemiptera

Order Hymenoptera, sawflies, bees, wasps, and ants

Order Isoptera

Order  Lepidoptera

Family Hesperiidae, skippers

Family Nymphalidae

Family Lycaenidae, gossamer-winged butterflies

Family Riodinidae, metalmarks

Family Sphingidae, hawk moths, sphinx moths

Family Papilionidae, hawk moths, sphinx moths

Order Mallophaga

Order Mecoptera, scorpionflies

Order Neuroptera

Order Odonata, dragonflies and damselflies

Suborder Anisoptera

Family Libellulidae

Suborder Zygoptera

Subfamily Coenagrionoidea

Order Orthoptera, grasshoppers, katydids, and crickets

Order Phasmida

Order Phthiraptera, lice

Order Plecoptera, stoneflies

Order Protura

Order Psocoptera

Order Siphonaptera

Order Siphunculata

Order Strepsiptera

Order Trichoptera

Order Thysanoptera

Order Thysanura

Order Zoraptera

Brachiopoda

Bryozoa

Class Gymnolaemata

Chaetognatha

Chordata
Subphylum Urochordata

Class Ascidiacea

Order Enterogona

Order Stolidobranchia

Order Phlebobranchia

Cnidaria

Class Scyphozoa, true jellyfish

Class Hydrozoa

Class Anthozoa, sea anemones and corals

Order Actiniaria

Order Pennatulacea

Ctenophora

Class Tentaculata

Cycliophora

Echinodermata

Class Asteroidea

Class Ophiuroidea

Class Echinoidea

Echiura

Entoprocta

Gastrotricha

Order Macrodasyida

Gnathostomulida

Hemichordata

Kinorhyncha

Loricifera

Order Nanaloricida

Micrognathozoa

Mollusca

Class Bivalvia, bivalves

Order Mytilida

Order Ostreida

Order Venerida

Order Myida

Class Gastropoda, gastropods

Order Archaeogastropoda

Order Pulmonata

Order Stylommatophora

Order Nudibranchia

Order Neotaenioglossa

Order Neogastropoda

Order Trochida

Order Littorinimorpha

Superfamily Aplysioidea

Order Cephalaspidea

Superfamily Cerithioidea

Class Cephalopoda, cephalopods

Subclass Coleoidea

Order Octopoda

Order Myopsida

Class Polyplacophora

Mesozoa

Nematoda

Nematomorpha

Nemertea

Class Anopla

Class Enopla

Onychophora

Pentastoma

Phoronida

Class Cestoda

Placozoa

Platyhelminthes

Class Cestoda

Class Turbellaria

Pogonophora

Porifera

Class Demospongiae

Subclass Tetractinomorpha

Order Astrophorida

Order Hadromerida

Order Spirophorida

Subclass Ceractinomorpha

Order Poecilosclerida

Suborder Myxillina

Priapulida

Rotifera

Sipuncula

Tardigrada

Class Heterotardigrada

Xenacoelomorpha

Notes

References

Invertebrates
California